The Best of Benny Hill is a 1974 film version of material from the television comedy series The Benny Hill Show. This movie features sketches from the early Thames Television years, from 1969 to 1973. All the sketches in the film are from the episodes produced and directed by John Robins.

Contents 
Some Sketches include:
 Ye Olde Wishing Well (19 November 1969) - including an appearance by David Prowse
 Lower Tidmarsh Hospital Service (19 November 1969)
 Spuddo Blooper (19 November 1969) - parodies of television adverts, for products such as margarine and mashed potato.
 "Throw Open" Blooper (19 November 1969)
 The Life of Maurice Dribble (25 December 1969)
 Tommy Tupper in Tupper-Time (4 February 1970) - a parody of Simon Dee and the chat show Dee Time
 Song: "My Garden Of Love" (11 March 1970)
 The Party Blooper (11 March 1970)
 "After Dinner with Charlotte Fudge" Blooper (11 March 1970)
 Boutique Mask Dance (28 October 1970)
 Love Will Find A Way (27 January 1971; presented in black and white, as production occurred during ITV's Colour Strike)
 The Grass Is Greener (24 March 1971)
 Fred Scuttle's Health Farm and Keep Fit Brigade (23 February 1972)
 Pierre De Tierre: Avant-Garde French Film Director (23 February 1972)
 Chow-Mein at Customs and Immigration (23 February 1972)
 Benny's All-Star Finale (23 February 1972) - including Benny Hill's impersonations of Nana Mouskouri, Moira Anderson and Gilbert O'Sullivan
 Escaped Convict Chase Sequence (23 February 1972)

Cast 
Benny Hill
Patricia Hayes
Henry McGee
Nicholas Parsons
Bob Todd
Jackie Wright
Andrée Melly
Rita Webb
Lesley Goldie
Jackie Wright
Penny Meredith
Michael Sharvell-Martin
Bettina Le Beau
Jenny Lee-Wright
David Prowse
Pamela Cundell
Arthur Hewlett
Roy Scammell
David Hamilton
Ken Sedd
Freddie Wiles

Production 
The original programs were recorded on videotape (studio interiors) and shot on 16 mm film (location footage); the videotaped material was transferred to 35 mm film as a telerecording, and the 16 mm footage was blown up to 35 mm.

Home media releases 
Anchor Bay Entertainment released the movie on DVD in 2001 for Region 1 format; it would later be re-released by Lionsgate Home Entertainment following Lionsgate's 2016 acquisition of Anchor Bay.

It was released by Network on DVD and Blu-ray in Region 2 format in 2016.

References

External links 
 

1974 films
Films based on television series
1974 comedy films
British comedy films
1970s English-language films
1970s British films
Films edited from television programs